Gabriel Ifeanyi "Iffe" Lundberg (born 4 December 1994) is a Nigerian-Danish professional basketball player for Virtus Bologna of the Italian Lega Basket Serie A (LBA) and the EuroLeague. He also represents the senior Danish national team. According to numerous Danish outlets, Lundberg is Denmark's best basketball player.

Professional career

Canarias (2019–2020)
In July 2019, Lundberg signed with CB 1939 Canarias for two years with the option of a third. He joined the team from the competitor Bàsquet Manresa where he had been a cornerstone of the team that won promotion to the Liga ACB.

Zielona Góra (2020–2021)
On 13 July 2020, Lundberg signed with Stelmet Zielona Góra of the Polish League. He averaged 20.4 points, 3.8 rebounds, 5.4 assists and 1.4 steals per game in the VTB United League during the 2020–21 season.

CSKA Moscow (2021–2022)
On February 15, 2021, he left Zielona Gora and signed with CSKA Moscow for the rest of the season. On July 2, 2021, Lundberg signed a three-year (2+1) extension with the Russian club. 

On February 27, 2022, upon the outbreak of the 2022 Russian invasion of Ukraine, he left the team. The team accused him of violating his contract.

Phoenix Suns (2022)
On March 12, 2022, the Phoenix Suns signed Lundberg to a two-way contract for the rest of the 2021–22 season. He subsequently became the first Danish player in history to sign an NBA contract since Lars Hansen, who did it in 1978. However, he did not make his NBA debut until April 3 against the Oklahoma City Thunder due to visa issues that stemmed from the 2022 Russian invasion of Ukraine. In the final game of the regular season, Lundberg recorded season-highs of 10 points, 5 rebounds, and 5 assists in a loss to the Sacramento Kings.

Virtus Bologna (2022–present)
On July 21, 2022, Lundberg signed a two-year deal with Virtus Bologna of the Italian Lega Basket Serie A (LBA) and the EuroLeague. On 29 September 2022, after having ousted Olimpia Milano in the semifinals, Virtus won its third Supercup, defeating 72–69 Banco di Sardegna Sassari and achieving a back-to-back, following the 2021 trophy.

National team
Lundberg has been a member of the Danish national basketball team. In November 2020, he led the team to two consecutive surprise victories against favorites Lithuania and the Czech Republic in the qualification round to the European championships. Lundberg had 28 points in the win against Lithuania which was named arguably the greatest victory in Danish basketball history. Against the Czech team, he scored 38 points, knocking down 7-of-9 from three-point range.

Personal life
Lundberg is a native of Copenhagen.  He is of Nigerian and Danish descent. In the early years, he played 3x3 streetball at the local street courts in Vesterbro, the Copenhagen neighborhood in which he grew up. He was a regular at the GAME Finals Streetball Tournament at the Town Hall Square each summer and watched from the stands, when his older brother Abdel Jaleel Lundberg competed in the Elite Division and the Slam Dunk Contest, winning it several times. Iffe later joined Falcon Basketball Club where he played during most of his childhood. In the off-season Iffe would come back to play streetball and won in 2009 2nd place at the GAME Finals Streetball Tournament with his team.

Career statistics

NBA

|-
| style="text-align:left;"| 
| style="text-align:left;"| Phoenix
| 4 || 0 || 11.0 || .263 || .375 || — || 1.8 || 2.8 || .8 || .0 || 3.3
|- class="sortbottom"
| style="text-align:center;" colspan="2"| Career
| 4 || 0 || 11.0 || .263 || .375 || — || 1.8 || 2.8 || .8 || .0 || 3.3

EuroLeague

|-
| style="text-align:left;"| 2020–21
| style="text-align:left;" rowspan=2| CSKA Moscow
| 15 || 2 || 20.1 || .564 || .436 || .583 || 2.5 || 2.2 || .9 || .0 || 11.3 || 11.6
|-
| style="text-align:left;"| 2021–22
| 24 || 16 || 21.1 || .446 || .333 || .833 || 2.4 || 2.0 || .9 || .1 || 9.1 || 8.0
|- class="sortbottom"
| style="text-align:center;" colspan=2| Career
| 39 || 18 || 20.7 || .492 || .371 || .714 || 2.4 || 2.1 || .9 || .0 || 9.9|| 9.4

References

External links
EuroLeague profile
Basketball Champions League profile 
RealGM profile
 Eurobasket.com profile

1994 births
Living people
Bàsquet Manresa players
Basket Zielona Góra players
CB Canarias players
Danish expatriate basketball people in Spain
Danish expatriate basketball people in the United States
Danish men's basketball players
Danish people of Nigerian descent
PBC CSKA Moscow players
Phoenix Suns players
Point guards
Shooting guards
Sportspeople from Copenhagen
Undrafted National Basketball Association players